Heliozela angulata is a moth of the family Heliozelidae. It was described by Lee, Hirowatari and Kuroko in 2006 and is endemic to Japan (Honshu).

The forewings are pale greyish ochreous with brassy reflections. The hindwings are dark grey with metallic reflections.

References

External links

Moths described in 2006
Heliozelidae
Endemic fauna of Japan
Moths of Japan